Lenište is a village in Municipality of Prilep in North Macedonia.

As of the 2021 census, Lenište had 2 residents with the following ethnic composition:
Macedonians 2

References 

Villages in Prilep Municipality